An exponent is a phonological manifestation of a morphosyntactic property.  In non-technical language, it is the expression of one or more grammatical properties by sound. There are several kinds of exponents:

Identity
Affixation
Reduplication
Internal modification
Subtraction

Identity
The identity exponent is both simple and common: it has no phonological manifestation at all.

An example in English: 
DEER + PLURAL → deer

Affixation
Affixation is the addition of an affix (such as a prefix, suffix or infix) to a word.

Example in English:
want + PAST → wanted

Reduplication
Reduplication is the repetition of part of a word.  

An example in Sanskrit:
दा dā ("give") + PRESENT + ACTIVE + INDICATIVE + FIRST PERSON + SINGULAR → ददामि  dadāmi (the da at the beginning is from reduplication of dā that involves a vowel change, a characteristic of class 3 verbs in Sanskrit)

Internal modification
There are several types of internal modification.  An internal modification may be segmental, meaning it changes a sound in the root.

An example in English:
STINK + PAST = stank (i becomes a)

An internal modification might be a suprasegmental modification.  An example would be a change in pitch or stress.

An example of the latter in English (acute accent indicates stress):
RECÓRD + NOUN = récord

Subtraction
Subtraction is the removal of a sound or a group of sounds.

An example in French:
OEUF /œf/ ("egg") + PLURAL = œufs /ø/ (final f is lost)

Linguistic morphology